Wong Hon Wai (born 1 March 1973) is a Malaysian politician who  served as the Member of Parliament (MP) for Bukit Bendera from May 2018 to November 2022, Member of the Penang State Executive Council (EXCO) in the Pakatan Rakyat (PR) state administration under former Chief Minister Lim Guan Eng from March 2008 to May 2013 and Member of the Penang State Legislative Assembly (MLA) for Air Itam from March 2008 to May 2018. He is a member of the Democratic Action Party (DAP), a component party of the Pakatan Harapan (PH) and formerly PR state ruling but federal opposition coalitions.

Election results

References

Living people
1973 births
People from Penang
Malaysian politicians of Chinese descent
Democratic Action Party (Malaysia) politicians
Members of the Dewan Rakyat
Members of the Penang State Legislative Assembly
21st-century Malaysian politicians